The California Area Public Library is the public library serving California, Pennsylvania and is a branch of the Washington County Library System. The library is located in the former Pennsylvania Railroad Passenger Station, which was listed on the National Register of Historic Places in 1979.

It is designated as a historic public landmark by the Washington County History & Landmarks Foundation.

On June 18, 1994, the Pennsylvania Historical and Museum Commission erected a historical marker at the California Area Public Library noting the importance of the California Boatyards.

History 
The building the library is located in was built in 1910 by the Pennsylvania Railroad to replace an older depot that was constructed in 1885.

The California Area Public Library was founded in 1935, but moved to its current location in the former train station on May 24, 1958. The library was closed in 1965 because of the lack of financial support. A year after the library building was listed on the National Register of Historic Places on June 19, 1979, the Washington County Library System was formed, which was joined by the California Area Public Library.

See also 
 National Register of Historic Places listings in Washington County, Pennsylvania

References

External links
California Area Public Library

 
 

Libraries on the National Register of Historic Places in Pennsylvania
Railway stations in the United States opened in 1910
Former railway stations in Pennsylvania
Public libraries in Pennsylvania
Railway stations on the National Register of Historic Places in Pennsylvania
Former Pennsylvania Railroad stations
Buildings and structures in Washington County, Pennsylvania
1935 establishments in Pennsylvania
California, Pennsylvania
National Register of Historic Places in Washington County, Pennsylvania